Stephen, Steve and Steven Green may refer to:

 Steph Green, American film and television director
 Stephen Green, Baron Green of Hurstpierpoint (born 1948), former HSBC CEO and British Minister of State for Trade and Investment
 Stephen Green (Christian Voice), head of Christian Voice, a UK fundamentalist lobby group
 Stephen L. Green (born 1938), founder of S.L. Green Realty, New York City
 Steve Green (baseball) (born 1978), Canadian baseball player
 Steve Green (basketball) (born 1953), American basketball player
 Steve Green (footballer) (born 1976), Jamaican footballer
 Steve Green (journalist) (born 1960), British co-editor of the magazine Critical Wave
 Steve Green (politician) (born 1960), member of the Minnesota House of Representatives
 Steve Green (singer) (born 1956), American Christian music singer
 Steven Green (cricketer) (born 1996), English cricketer
 Steven Alan Green, American comedian, writer and producer
 Steven Dale Green, former US soldier convicted of rape and murder
 Steven J. Green (born 1945), former United States Ambassador to the Republic of Singapore

See also
 Stephen Greene (disambiguation)
 St Stephen's Green, a Dublin park